Ehecatl or Ehécatl (from , "wind or air") may refer to:

 Ehecatl, a pre-Columbian Mesoamerican deity figure, associated as the Aztec god of winds to an aspect of Quetzalcoatl
 Hydra Technologies Ehécatl, an unmanned aerial vehicle designed and manufactured in Mexico